Andrea Melissa Blackett (born 24 January 1976, in London) is a Barbadian athlete who specializes in the 400 metres hurdles. She is also a women's track assistant coach at her alma mater, Rice University.

Her greatest achievement in athletics is the gold medal she won in the 400 metres hurdles at the 1998 Commonwealth Games in Kuala Lumpur in a games record time. Blackett was awarded the Barbados Service Star and the 1998 National Sports Personality of the Year award for Barbados for this achievement.

Blackett represented Barbados in six IAAF World Championships (1997–2007). She qualified for the final four times and in 1999 finished fourth. She competed in the 2000 Sydney Olympics, qualifying for the semi-final of the 400m hurdles and she competed in the 400m hurdles at the 2004 Athens Olympics. Andrea even competed in Edmonton in 2001 and also in Paris in 2003 where she earned sixth place. She has also represented her country at the World Indoor Athletics Championships.

She also has five medals from the Central American and Caribbean Championships and three from the Central American and Caribbean Games. Blackett has a personal best of 53.36 in the 400m hurdles, in Seville which is also a national record for Barbados. She set the Barbados 100m hurdles record of 13.39 in 2003 in Liège.

Career

Andrea's 4x400 meter time in the Indoor National Track and Field events led the Rice Owls to their first ever national title win in 1997. Her highest individual finish came in a second-place effort in the 400 metres hurdles in 1997. Blackett graduated from Rice University in 1997 with a bachelor's degree in managerial studies and Spanish, and she also holds a master's degree from the University of Houston in hotel management.

She also competed in the 2002 Commonwealth Games in Manchester but was unable to retain her title. Blackett featured in the 2003 documentary Running for God which followed her efforts to win at the games alongside fellow hurdlers Deon Hemmings and Natasha Danvers, and how their Christian faith influenced their careers.

Blackett was also selected in the Bajan team for the 2008 Olympics but was ruled out due to injury and retired from international competition.

Blackett has now finished her days of running but it hasn't stopped her from coaching for the Rice University's Women's Track Team as well as previously coaching for Barbados in the 2008 Beijing Olympic games.

International competitions

Personal bests

400 metres - 54.01 s (2006)
400 metres hurdles - 53.36 s (1999)
100 metres hurdles - 13.17 s (2000)

References

External links

1976 births
Living people
Barbadian female hurdlers
Barbadian female sprinters
World Athletics Championships athletes for Barbados
Olympic athletes of Barbados
Athletes (track and field) at the 2000 Summer Olympics
Athletes (track and field) at the 2004 Summer Olympics
Commonwealth Games gold medallists for Barbados
Commonwealth Games medallists in athletics
Athletes (track and field) at the 1998 Commonwealth Games
Athletes (track and field) at the 2002 Commonwealth Games
Pan American Games silver medalists for Barbados
Pan American Games bronze medalists for Barbados
Pan American Games medalists in athletics (track and field)
Athletes (track and field) at the 1999 Pan American Games
Athletes (track and field) at the 2003 Pan American Games
Athletes (track and field) at the 2007 Pan American Games
Competitors at the 1998 Central American and Caribbean Games
Central American and Caribbean Games silver medalists for Barbados
Rice Owls track and field coaches
Rice Owls women's track and field athletes
People educated at Harrison College (Barbados)
University of Houston alumni
Athletes from London
English sportspeople of Barbadian descent
Central American and Caribbean Games medalists in athletics
Medalists at the 1999 Pan American Games
Medalists at the 2003 Pan American Games
Medallists at the 1998 Commonwealth Games